Physalins are steroidal constituents of Physalis plants which possess an unusual 13,14-seco-16,24-cyclo-steroidal ring skeleton (where the bond that is normally present between the 13 and 14 positions in other steroids is broken while a new bond between positions 16 and 24 is formed; see figure below). Since the isolation and the structure determination of Physalin A and Physalin B in 1969, more than a dozen Physalins were isolated from Physalis species, Physalis alkekengi, Physalis angulata, and Physalis lancifolia. These compounds have antimicrobial, and antiparasitic effects.

References

Steroids